Tabernaemontana peduncularis is a species of plant in the family Apocynaceae. It is found in Indochina and western Malaysia.

References

peduncularis